Hindibaba is a village in the Çüngüş District of Diyarbakır Province in Turkey with a Zaza population.

History
The village is believed to have been built by Zaza refugees who had been fleeing from Twelver Shias in modern day Iran during the early ages of the Ottoman Empire.

References

Villages in Çüngüş District